Mere Angne Mein (Family Affairs) is an Indian soap opera that aired on Star Plus from 15 June 2015 to 5 August 2017. The show starred Krutika Desai Khan, Ekta Kaul, Karam Rajpal and Ananya Khare.

Plot

Mere Angne Mein showcases the lives of the Shrivastavs, a typically middle-class family in Mughalsarai, Uttar Pradesh, India. Shanti is the family matriarch who handles the family affairs in her own style and has complete control over other family members and their activities in the house. When the new bride Riya enters the family on marrying Shivam, she is in conflict with the established order of the house and Shanthi. In addition, the extended family of Shrivastavs has a dysfunctional family of her daughter, Sarla. The story is interwoven with these two families' saga of incoherent conflicts.

Cast

Main
 Krutika Desai Khan as Shanti Devi Srivastava/ Shashikala/ Ammaji: Naresh's sister; Basesarnath's widow; Sarla and Raghav's mother (2015–17)
 Karam Rajpal as Shivam Srivastava/ Bullet Raja: Kaushalya and Raghav's son; Preeti and Namita's brother; Riya's Husband.(2015–17)
Ekta Kaul as Riya Srivastava (nee Mathur): Anupam's daughter; Shivam's wife (2015–17)

Recurring
 Suchita Trivedi as Kaushalya Mehat Srivastava/ Khusiya: Raghav's wife; Shivam, Preeti and Namita's mother (2015–17)
 Ananya Khare as Sarla Srivastava Agarwal: Shanti and Basesarnath's daughter; Raghav's sister; Ashok's wife; Parineeta, Amit and Sonal's mother (2015–17) 
 Varun Badola as Raghav Srivastava: Shanti and Basesarnath's son; Sarla's brother; Kaushalya's husband; Shivam, Preeti and Namita's father (2015–17)
 Ishaan Singh Manhas as Golu Singh (2017)
 Charu Asopa as Preeti Srivastava Khare/ Preetya: Kaushalya and Raghav's daughter; Shivam and Namita's sister; Nand Kishore's wife (2015–17) 
 Dushyant Wagh as Nand Kishore Khare/Nandu; Preeti's husband (2016–17)
 Garima Parihar as Namita Srivastava/Nimmi; Kaushalya and Raghav's daughter; Shivam and Preeti's sister; Vyom's widow (2015–17)
 Roshni Rastogi as Rani Chauhan Agarwal/Raniya; Amit's wife (2015–17)
 Pallavi Gupta as Parineeta Agarwal Sinha/Pari; Ashok and Sarla's daughter Amit and Sonal's sister (2015–17)
 Neeraj Malviya as Amit Agarwal; Ashok and Sarla's son; Parineeta and Sonal's brother; Rani's husband (2015–17)
 Ashiesh Roy as Ashok Agarwal; Sarla's husband; Parineeta, Amit and Sonal's father (2015–17)
 Abhilash Chaudhary as Ramesh (2016–17)
 Anuj Thakur as Chandra (2017)
 Shreya Laheri as Sonal Agarwal; Ashok and Sarla's daughter; Parineeta and Amit's sister (2015–16)
 Akankssha Bhatia as Bunty (2015–16)
 Abhishek Singh Pathania/Shresth Kumar as Vyom Sinha; Namita's husband (2015–16)
 Sudhir Pandey as Naresh Ajmera (2015)
 Pratima Kazmi/Amita Udgata as Laleshwari Sahay/Laliya (2015)
 Yaseer Nomani as Munna (2016)
 Vijay Kalvani as Krishan Gupta (2015–16)
 Kapil Arya as Ajay (2017)
 Shraman Jain as Mohit "Mihir" Pahuja (2015–16)
 Wasim Mushtaq as Sujeev Sinha (2015–16)
Suniil Raghuvansh as Bhooshit Chauhan
 Pawan Chopra as Anupam Mathur (2015–16)
 Neelu Kohli as Sharmili Sinha (2016)
 Puja Sharma as Chanda (2016)
 Varun Jain as Pramod Prasad (2017)
 Ritesh M Shukla as Jokar chor (2017)

Production
In June 2016, Nilu Kohli quit being unhappy with her character shaping up.

In October 2016, Ekta Kaul took break from the series for her holiday. But soon after it when she returned to shoot, that day due to Dengue she took break from shoot and the script was rewritten for her absence. In February 2017, lead Ekta Kaul quit owning personal reasons and her character was killed after giving birth. In the same month, Ananya Khare quit stating multiple reasons. After Kaul's exit, Richa Mukherjee was cast as new female lead Aarthi. However, after Kaul and Khare's exit, as the ratings declined, it went off air on 5 August 2017.

References

External links

 Mere Angne Mein streaming on Hotstar

StarPlus original programming
2015 Indian television series debuts
2017 Indian television series endings
Indian television series
Indian television soap operas
Serial drama television series
Television shows set in Uttar Pradesh